XOXO is the debut studio album by South Korean-Chinese boy band Exo, released on June 3, 2013, by SM Entertainment and distributed by KT Music. The album is a follow-up to the group's debut EP, Mama (2012). The album was released in two versions – a Korean "Kiss" edition and a Chinese "Hug" edition.

Two singles were released from XOXO: "Wolf" and "Growl", the latter being the lead single off the album's repackaged version released on August 5, 2013. Both singles went to chart in the top ten of the Gaon Digital Chart, and "Growl" peaked at number 3 on the Billboard K-pop Hot 100. The album won Album of the Year at the 2013 Mnet Asian Music Awards and sold over 1 million copies, entering the list of the best-selling albums in Korea .

Background
The album's lead single, "늑대와 미녀" ("The Wolf and the Beauty"), known in English as simply "Wolf", was composed by Will Simms, Nermin Harambašić from Dsign Music and SM Entertainment resident songwriter Kenzie. Kenzie also provided the lyrics for the Korean version of the song while Zhou Weijie penned the lyrics for the Mandarin Chinese version, "狼与美女".  Yoo Young-jin provides background vocals. The dance for the song was choreographed by Tony Testa. In several shows such as Arirang's After School Club, the members explain that the dance has 3 elements: the trees and forest, the caves, and the wolf itself. Member Kris revealed that it took them approximately 3 to 4 months to get the choreography down, due to its level of difficulty.   A demo version of the song was leaked in February 2013, in response to which producer Ryan Jhun later gave a warning to illegal downloaders on May 29, 2013, "...I will report it to FBI and service department for all links...".

Several "developmental" tracks were produced and recorded in 2011 before Exo's official debut into the entertainment industry but never made it into the first EP Mama.  Some of these tracks were included on the XOXO album, including "Black Pearl" and "My Lady".

In July 2013, a re-package version of 'XOXO', renamed 으르렁 (Growl), was developed with three additional tracks.  The single from this edition was its title track "Growl". The song was recorded in both Korean and Mandarin Chinese ("咆哮") versions.  Composed by Hyuk Shin (Joombas), DK, Jordan Kyle, John Major, and Jarah Gibson, "Growl" is a dance-pop song with contemporary R&B and funk influences.  The single was prematurely leaked online on July 27, when a video of the group practicing to the Korean version of the song was uploaded to various video-sharing websites.

Release and promotion
May 30, 2013, the Korean and Chinese versions of the music video for "Wolf" were released,  and the song's first performance was made on Mnet M! Countdown.  Both song versions were released digitally on June 3, 2013, and on the same day, two physical formats of the entire album XOXO were also released in South Korea: a "Kiss" edition in Korean and a "Hug" edition in Mandarin.  After a performance on SBS Inkigayo on June 3, 2013, Exo visited and thanked 2,000 fans who had been waiting at a nearby park to meet them. The first performance of the Mandarin version of the song was aired on a popular Chinese variety show Happy Camp in mid-June.

The album reached over 300,000 collective pre-orders, and peaked at number one on the Billboard World Album Chart a week after release. As of December 2013, the Korean and Chinese versions of the album, as well as their respective repackaged versions, have collectively sold over 1,070,000 copies, making it the best-selling album of the year in the K-pop industry. With over a million copies sold, XOXO also became Korea's best-selling album in 12 years.

Awards

Track listing 
Credits adapted from Naver.

XOXO (original edition)

Growl (repackaged edition)

Charts
Korean and Chinese versions

Combined version

Sales and shipments

Album sales

XOXO

Growl (Repackage)

Release history

References

2013 debut albums
SM Entertainment albums
KMP Holdings albums
Korean-language albums
Exo albums
Genie Music albums
Grand Prize Golden Disc Award-winning albums